Tougué (Pular: 𞤍𞤢𞤤𞤭𞥅𞤪𞤫 𞤚𞤵𞤺𞤫𞥅) is a prefecture located in the Labé Region of Guinea. The capital is Tougué. The prefecture covers an area of 6,400 km2. and has an estimated population of 132,000.

Sub-prefectures
The prefecture is divided administratively into 10 sub-prefectures:
 Tougué-Centre
 Fatako
 Fello-Koundoua
 Kansangui
 Koin
 Kolangui
 Kollet
 Konah
 Kouratongo
 Tangali

Prefectures of Guinea
Labé Region